Bakht may refer to:

People
Bakht Singh, Indian evangelist
Bakht Khan, Indian commander in the 19th century
Bakht Zamina, Afghan Pashto singer
Bidar Bakht, 15th/16th century Indian Mughal prince
Bakht-un-Nissa Begum, Mughal princess
Sikander Bakht, Indian politician
Sikander Bakht (cricketer), Indian cricketer

Places
Baxt, Uzbekistan